Dale Lightfoot (born 7 September 1964) is a New Zealand archer. He competed in the men's individual event at the 1984 Summer Olympics.

References

1964 births
Living people
New Zealand male archers
Olympic archers of New Zealand
Archers at the 1984 Summer Olympics
Sportspeople from Auckland